National Indoor Arena may refer to:
 Utilita Arena Birmingham (previously the National Indoor Arena, Barclaycard Arena and Arena Birmingham) in Birmingham, United Kingdom
 Scottish National Indoor Arena, later the Commonwealth Arena or Emirates Arena, in Glasgow, United Kingdom
 National Indoor Arena (Ireland)
 National Indoor Arena (Jamaica)